The Virgin and Child with Two Angels is a painting by the Italian Renaissance master Sandro Botticelli, dating to . It is in the Museo Nazionale di Capodimonte, in Naples.

The work was once attributed to Filippino Lippi, master of Botticelli. The composition essentially derives from Botticelli's master (and Filippino Lippi's father) Filippo Lippi. The faces and other details suggest that the work is of around the same period as Botticelli's Fortitude and his other early Madonnas. The composition is similar to that of Andrea del Verrocchio's Virgin and Child with Two Angels, probably dating to a year or two earlier.

References

Bibliography
Legouix, Susan, Botticelli, 2004 (revised edition), Chaucer Press,

External links

1469 paintings
Paintings in the collection of the Museo di Capodimonte
Paintings of the Madonna and Child by Sandro Botticelli
Angels in art